Edvaldo Gonzaga de Oliveira (born 25 June 1982) is a Brazilian former professional boxer who competed from 2005 to 2007. As an amateur, he competed in the men's featherweight event at the 2004 Summer Olympics.

References

External links
 

1982 births
Living people
Brazilian male boxers
Olympic boxers of Brazil
Boxers at the 2004 Summer Olympics
Place of birth missing (living people)
Featherweight boxers
Sportspeople from Salvador, Bahia
20th-century Brazilian people
21st-century Brazilian people